The Miami River is a stream, approximately  long, on the coast of northwest Oregon in the United States. It drains a mountainous timbered region of the Northern Oregon Coast Range west of Portland, into Pacific Ocean.

The river rises in northern Tillamook County in the Tillamook State Forest and flows generally southwest, entering the north end of Tillamook Bay near Garibaldi. It is one of five rivers—the Tillamook, the Trask, the Wilson, the Kilchis, and the Miami—that flow into the bay.

The river's name is based on the Chinook Jargon phrase Mi-me Chuck, meaning a tributary or downriver stream. Over time the expressive became corrupted into Miami, the familiar place name used in Ohio, Florida, and elsewhere.

Course
Illingsworth Creek enters from the left and Struby Creek and Hobson Creek from the right just before the river passes under U.S. Route 101. Electric Creek enters from the left as the river enters Miami Cove on Tillamook Bay. At this point, Garibaldi is to the river's right. Miami Road runs along the lower stretches of the river.

See also
List of rivers of Oregon

References

External links
Tillamook Estuaries Partnership

Rivers of Oregon
Rivers of Tillamook County, Oregon